For True is a studio album by American jazz musician Troy 'Trombone Shorty' Andrews. The album was released on September 13, 2011 on Verve Forecast Records as a follow up to his major label debut, Backatown (2010). It reached number 1 on the Billboard Jazz Albums Chart and was his first album to chart on the Billboard 200.

Track listing

Personnel
Per liner notes
Troy 'Trombone Shorty' Andrews – vocals, trombone, trumpet, organ, piano, keyboard, synth bass, percussion

Orleans Avenue
Pete Murano – guitar
Mike Ballard – bass
Joey Peebles – drums
Dwayne Williams – percussion
Dan Oestreicher – baritone saxophone
Tim McFatter – tenor saxophone

Additional musicians
5th Ward Weebie – vocals on "Buckjump"
Ben Ellman – percussion on "Buckjump"; Harmonica on "Big 12"
Charlie Smith – percussion on "Buckjump"
Warren Haynes – guitar solo on "Encore"
Jeff Beck – guitar solo on "For True"
Clarence Slaughter – tenor sax on "Lagniappe" (Part 1 & 2)
Stanton Moore – drums on "Lagniappe" (Part 1 & 2)
Kid Rock – vocals on "Mrs. Orleans"
Robert Mercurio – bass on "Mrs. Orleans"
Ivan Neville – vocals and clavinet on "Nervis"
Cyril Neville – vocals on "Nervis"
Lenny Kravitz – bass on "Roses"
Ledisi – vocals on "Then There Was You"

Production
Ben Ellman – producer, engineer
Mikael "Count" Eldridge – mixing, mastering, additional production on tracks 1, 3, 9, and 12
George Drakoulias – producer on track 6
David Bianco – mixing on track 6
Ben Lorio – engineer on tracks 2 and 9
Charles Smith – vocal engineer
Kirk Edwards – photography
Meire Murakami – design
Vartan – art direction

Charts

Weekly charts

Year-end charts

References

2011 albums
Trombone Shorty albums
Jazz fusion albums by American artists